The Mian is a Pakistani Punjabi noble Arain family who were the owner of Ishaqpura region, the territory where the Mughal Empire wanted to build a Garden named as Shalimar in Lahore.

Historical background
The Baghbanpura family members ware considered authoritative by the Mughals for their services for the community. The Mughal emperor Shah Jahan gave the larger extended family the title of 'Mian'. Mian Muhammad Yousaf, then family head, gifted his ancestral land to the emperor in lieu of a garden. The project was finished by 1642 AD and emperor Shah Jahan granted the area back to the same family appointing them as the custodians of the site and Shalimar Gardens, Lahore. Since that day to General Ayub Khan's martial law, the Shalimar Garden was under the care of the same family. With passage of time, their extended family also adopted the title 'Mian'. By the 20th century, off-shoots of Arain tribe associated with Mian Family also adopted Mian as their surname, now commonly referred to as 'Mian Baradari' (community or sub-tribe) in general.

Origins 
The Mian Arain family has been residing in Baghbanpura, Lahore since the 10th century.

British Raj period 
The British favoured the ‘Mian family’ for their "hard work, frugality and sense of discipline". Subsequent development of towns and cities and increasing urbanisation resulted in their additional value. Many of them used the profession of law and some of them used journalism to enter politics.

Notable people
 Sir Mian Mohammad Shafi (1869 – 1932) – Member, Viceroy's Executive Council.
 Mian Sir Muhammad Shah Nawaz – a politician in Punjab during the 1920s
 Justice Sir Mian Abdul Rashid – first Chief Justice of Pakistan (1947)
 Mian Iftikharuddin – politician, owner of Pakistan Times and Daily Imroz
 Mian Muhammad Yusaf Manga – a noble zamindar who was appointed custodian of the Shalimar Gardens, Lahore by Mughals and received the title of 'Mian' from Mughal emperor Shah Jahan)
 Jahanara Shahnawaz (1896-1979) – politician and Muslim League activist.
 Mumtaz Shahnawaz (1912-1948) – political activist and author, who died in a plane crash at the age of 35 en route to represent Pakistan at the UN General Assembly, the first woman in Asia to preside over a legislative session
 Justice Mian Shah Din (1868–1918) – first Muslim judge in British India, poet, and writer
 Justice Ajmal Mian (1934 - 2017) - former Chief Justice of the Supreme Court of Pakistan
 Salahuddin Mian (1938 - 2006) - Pakistan's first ceramic or pottery artist

References

External links

Punjabi tribes
 Punjabi-language surnames
Pakistani names
Social groups of Punjab, Pakistan